Geplafuvirales is an order of viruses.

Families
The following families are recognized:

 Geminiviridae
 Genomoviridae

References

Single-stranded DNA viruses